Awards and decorations of the United States Department of the Air Force are military decorations which are issued by the Department of the Air Force to airmen of the United States Air Force and guardians of the United States Space Force and members of other military branches serving under Air Force and Space Force commands. 

The Department of the Air Force first began issuing awards and decorations in 1947. At that time, airmen were eligible to receive most U.S. Army decorations. In 1962, following the Cuban Missile Crisis, the Department of the Air Force began a concentrated effort to create its own distinctive awards, separate from the Army.

Airmen and guardians are also eligible to receive approved foreign awards and approved international decorations.

Department of the Air Force awards

Air Force and Space Force decorations

Air Force and Space Force service medals

Air Force and Space Force Good Conduct Medals

Air Force and Space Force unit awards

Air Force and Space Force service ribbons

Air Force and Space Force award badges

Department of the Air Force civilian awards

 Air Force Decoration for Exceptional Civilian Service: similar to the military Distinguished Service Medal. A gold-colored medal bearing the Air Force coat of arms with a wreath of laurel leaves. Ribbon is dark-blue silk with three dotted golden-orange lines in the center.
 Air Force Valor Award: similar to the Airman's Medal. Gold-colored medal design bearing the Air Force thunderbolt on an equilateral triangle surmounted by the Air Force eagle perched on a scroll inscribed "Valor" within an olive wreath. Ribbon is light blue with four yellow stripes, two dark blue stripes, and one red stripe in the center.
 Air Force Outstanding Civilian Career Service Award: similar to the military Legion of Merit. Bronze medal bearing the Air Force coat of arms with a wreath of laurel leaves. Ribbon is white trimmed in maroon with three maroon stripes in the center.
 Air Force Meritorious Civilian Service Award: similar to the military Meritorious Service Medal. Sterling silver medal and lapel emblem bearing the Air Force coat of arms with a wreath of laurel leaves. Lapel emblem with ruby indicates receipt of more than one Meritorious Civilian Service Award.
 Air Force Command Award for Valor: similar to the military Meritorious Service Medal when awarded for heroism. Sterling silver medal of the same design as the Air Force Valor Award. Ribbon is light-blue silk with four yellow stripes and one red stripe in the center.
 Air Force Exemplary Civilian Service Award: For clearly outstanding service supporting a command mission for at least one year or a single act that significantly contributed to command mission. Similar to the military Commendation Medal.
Air Force Civilian Achievement Award: For clearly outstanding service for a single, specific act or accomplishment in support of the unit’s mission or goals. Similar to the military Achievement Medal.

Public service awards
 Secretary of the Air Force Distinguished Public Service Award: For distinguished public service to the Air Force which translates into substantial contributions to the accomplishment of the Air Force mission. This is the highest public service award bestowed to private citizens by the Secretary of the Air Force.
 Chief of Staff of the Air Force Award for Exceptional Public Service: For Sustained unselfish dedication, contributions, and exceptional support to the Air Force.
 Air Force Exceptional Service Award: For exceptional service to the United States Air Force or for an act of heroism involving voluntary risk of life. 
 Air Force Scroll of Appreciation: For meritorious achievement or service that are completely voluntary and performed as a public service or patriotic in nature.
 Air Force Commander's Award for Public Service: For service or achievements which contribute significantly to the accomplishment of the mission of an Air Force activity, command, or staff agency.

Special awards and trophies 
In 2018, as part of the Air Force's initiative to reduced directive publications, the eight-page AFI 36-2805 was released, superseding 30 previous AFIs.  Guidance for special awards was moved to a website at https://access.afpc.af.mil/.
 Cheney Award (an act of valor, extreme fortitude or self-sacrifice in a humanitarian interest, performed in connection with aircraft)
 Mackay Trophy (most meritorious flight of the year)
 12 Outstanding Airmen of the Year (sponsored by Air Force Association)
 Lance P. Sijan USAF Leadership Award
 USAF First Sergeant of the Year Award
 General and Mrs. Jerome F. O'Malley Award (wing commander and spouse team)
 Joan Orr Air Force Spouse of the Year Award
 Koren Kolligian Jr. Trophy (safety)
 General Thomas D. White USAF Space Trophy
 General Wilbur L. Creech Maintenance Excellence Award
 Dr. James G. Roche Sustainment Excellence Award
 General Lew Allen, Jr. Trophy (officer and senior NCO in aircraft maintenance or munitions directly involved with setting up aircraft sorties with nuclear weapons)
 Lieutenant General Leo Marquez Award
 Brigadier General Sarah P. Wells Award (Air Force Medical Service)
 Aviator Valor Award (sponsored by American Legion Aviators' Post No. 743)
 General John P. Jumper Awards for Excellence in Warfighting Integration
 Information Dominance/Cyberspace Awards:
 Lieutenant General Harold W. Grant Award (small communications unit)
 Major General Harold M. McClelland Award (large communications unit)
 General Edwin W. Rawlings Award (team of the year)

See also
 Awards and decorations of the United States military

Notes

External links
 AFI36-2903 Dress and Personal Appearance of Air Force Personnel
 AFI36-2805, Special Awards and Trophies
 AFI36-2818, The USAF Maintenance Awards Program

 
United States Air Force